The Basilica of Santa Maria di Campagna is a Roman Catholic basilica church in the city of Piacenza in the Province of Piacenza, Italy. It was built in a Greek-Cross plan with an octagonal dome in a high Renaissance style in the 16th century.

History

It was built in 1522–28, under the patronage of a local guild. The site had housed a sanctuary dedicated to Santa Maria di Campagnola, and housed a wooden image of the Madonna and Child from the 14th century. Tradition holds that Pope Urban II in 1095 announced the First Crusade from this site.

The architect of the Renaissance church was the native Alessio Tramello. Among the artists active inside the church were Giovanni Antonio Sacchi (Il Pordenone), Camillo Procaccini, and Gaspare Traversi.  The sacristy contains canvases by Gaspare Landi and Giulio Campi. The Chapel of Saint Anthony has works by Pietro Antonio Avanzini, Camillo Procaccini, and a member of the Galli-Bibiena Family. In the south transept are works of Alessandro Tiarini, Antonio Triva, and Ignazio Stern. The Chapel of Santa Vittoria Martire has works by Ferrante Moreschi, Bernardino Gatti (St George slaying the Dragon), Paolo Bozzini,  Ludovico Pesci and Daniele Crespi. The nave ceiling has paintings by  the 19th-century painter Giovanni Battista Ercole.

Among the masterpieces of the churcha are the frescoes in the cupola depicting God and Glory of Angels with Saints are works by Pordenone and Bernardino Gatti. The marble pavement was completed by the Milanese artist, Giambattista Carrà (1595). The statue of Ranuccio I Farnese was carved in 1616 by the Baroque sculptor Francesco Mochi.

References

Roman Catholic churches completed in 1528
16th-century Roman Catholic church buildings in Italy
Roman Catholic churches in Piacenza
Renaissance architecture in Piacenza
Octagonal churches in Italy